The Miss New Mexico USA competition is the pageant that selects the representative for the state of New Mexico in the Miss USA pageant. It is directed by Laura's Productions based in El Paso, Texas.

New Mexico achieved many placements in the 1960s to the '80s and produced one Miss USA, Mai Shanley in 1984. The most recent placement was Suzanne Perez in 2022, placing in the Top 12.

Suzanne Perez of Portales has been crowned as Miss New Mexico USA 2022 on June 5, 2022 at the New Mexico Farm and Ranch Heritage Museum in Las Cruces. She represented New Mexico for the title of Miss USA 2022, placed at the top 12.

Results summary
Miss USA: Mai Shanley (1984)
1st runners-up: Brenda Denton (1985), Alejandra Gonzalez (2019)
2nd runners-up: Judith Baldwin (1965)
4th runners-up: Bonnie Tafoya (1968), Marlena Garland (1978)
Top 5: Michelle Rios (1999)
Top 10/11/12: Donna Reel (1972), Jonelle Bergquist (1976), Denise Funderburk (1977), Kathy Dawn Patrick (1980), Kriston "Kiki" Killgore (1987), Alina Ogle (2003), Suzanne Perez (2022)
Top 15/16: Joan Schwartz (1955), Sandra Fullingim (1963), Mary Gard (1969), Jenna Hardin (2004), Brittany Toll (2011)
New Mexico holds a record of 19 placements at Miss USA.

Awards
Miss Photogenic: Michele Sandoval (1979)
Best State Costume: Kriston "Kiki" Killgore (1987)
People's Choice & Fan Favorite: Brittany Toll (2011)

Winners 
Color key

References

External links
Official website

New Mexico
New Mexico culture
Women in New Mexico
Recurring events established in 1952
1952 establishments in New Mexico